The following is a list of notable alumni and faculty of Universiti Sains Malaysia.

Government and politics

Head of state and governors
 TYT Tun Mohd Ali Rustam, Governor of Malacca (2020-Incumbent) and Chief Minister of Malacca (1999-2013).

Ministers and Deputy Ministers
 Hon. Justin Valentin, Education Minister of Seychelles (2020-Incumbent).
 Yusril Ihza Mahendra, Human Rights & Justice Minister of Indonesia (2004-2007).
 YB Teresa Kok Suh Sim, Member of Parliament for Seputeh & Minister of Primary Industries Malaysia (2018-2020).
 YB Dato’ Seri Idris Jusoh, Member of Parliament for Besut, Minister of Higher Education Malaysia (2013-2018) & Menteri Besar of Terengganu (2004-2008).
 YB Datuk Abdul Rahim Bakri, Deputy Minister of Finance (2020-Incumbent) & Member of Parliament for Kudat.
 YB Datuk Seri Dr. Ronald Kiandee, Minister of Agriculture and Food Industries (2020-Incumbent) & Member of Parliament for Beluran.
 YB Datuk Awang Hashim, Deputy Minister of Human Resources (2020 - Incumbent) & Member of Parliament for Pendang.
 Dato’ Seri Idris Jala, Minister in the Prime Minister's Department (2009-2015).
 YB Dato’ Dr. Mansor Othman, Deputy Minister of Environment and Water (2021-Incumbent), Deputy Minister of Higher Education (2020-2021) & Member of Parliament for Nibong Tebal.
 YB Dato’ Seri Mahdzir Khalid, Minister of Rural Development (2021-Incumbent), Minister of Education Malaysia (2013-2018) & Menteri Besar of Kedah (2005-2008).
 YB Senator Dato’ Seri Dr. Zulkifli Mohamad Al-Bakri, Minister in the Prime Minister's Department (Islamic Affairs) (2020-2021), Mufti of the Federal Territories (2014-2020).
 YB Dato Sri Lee Kim Shin, Sarawak State Minister for Transport (2019 - Incumbent) & State Assemblyman for Senadin.

Menteri Besars and Chief Minister
 YAB Chow Kon Yeow, Chief Minister of Penang (2018-Incumbent) & Member of Parliament for Tanjung(2018-incumbent).
 YAB Dato’ Sri Wan Rosdy Wan Ismail, Menteri Besar of Pahang (2018-Incumbent).
 YAB Dato' Seri Muhammad Sanusi Md Nor, Menteri Besar of Kedah (2020-Incumbent).
 Dato’ Seri Ahmad Said, Menteri Besar of Terengganu (2008-2014).
 Dato' Seri Dr. Md Isa Sabu, Menteri Besar of Perlis (2008-2013).

Elected Representatives and politicians
 Raj Munni Sabu@Aiman Athirah Al-Jundi, Senator of Dewan Negara, Parliament of Malaysia (2018-incumbent).
 Datuk Dr. Chandra Muzaffar, Political Analyst & Deputy President of Parti Keadilan Rakyat(1999-2002).
 Jeff Ooi Chuan Aun, Member Parliament of Jelutong (2008-2018).
 YB Kumaresan Arumugam, Penang state assemblyman of Batu Uban (2018-incumbent).
 YB Syerleena Abdul Rashid, Penang state assemblyman of Seri Delima (2018-incumbent).
 YB Nor Azrina Surip, Member Parliament of Merbok (2018-Incumbent).

Public Services
 Tan Sri Abu Kassim Mohamed, Chief Commissioner of Malaysian Anti-Corruption Commission.
 Al-Ishsal Ishak, chairman of Malaysian Communications and Multimedia Commission (2018-2020).
 Tan Sri Dr. Madinah Mohamad, Auditor General of Malaysia (2017-2019).
 Prof. Dr. Md. Nasir Ibrahim, Chief Executive Officer of National Film Development Corporation Malaysia (FINAS) (2021 - present).
 Dato' Ramlan bin Harun, Secretary-General of Ministry of Rural Development (KPLB). (2021 - present).
 Dato' Suriani binti Dato' Ahmad, Secretary-General of Ministry of Entrepreneur Development and Cooperative (MEDAC) (2020 - present), former Secretary-General of Ministry of Communications and Multimedia (KKMM) (2019 - 2020) and Ministry of Women, Family and Community Development (KPWKM) (2017).

Academia
 Prof. Emeritus Tan Sri Dato’ Dzulkifli Abdul Razak, rector of International Islamic University of Malaysia (2018-Incumbent) & former vice-chancellor of USM (2000-2011).
 Dr. Lim Boo Liat, an eminent zoologist and mammalogist. 
 Tan Sri Datuk Mustafa Mansur, pro-chancellor of USM (2011-Incumbent).
 Prof. Dato’ Dr. Omar Osman, vice-chancellor of DRB-HICOM University (2017-Incumbent) & vice-chancellor of USM (2011-2016).

Muftis and religious scholars
 Dato’ Dr. Mohd Asri Zainal Abidin, Mufti of Perlis (2015-Incumbent, 2006–2008).

Artists, singers and celebrities
 Daphne Iking, Malaysia TV host & celebrity.
 Diana Amir, Malaysia Actress & TV Host.
 Nadia Min Dern Heng, Miss World Malaysia 2010.
 Adrian Teh Kean Kok, Malaysia film director.
 Kee Thuan Chye, Malaysia actor, poet, dramatist & journalist.
 Kamarul Bahrin Haron, Ex-Editor in Chief of Astro Awani.
 Azharuddin Ramli@Arja Lee, Malaysia actor & singer.
 Tan Sri Datuk Jins Samsuddin, Malaysia film director & actor.
 Prof. Dr. Samat Salleh, Malaysia actor, theatre activist, film director, former dean & lecturer of School of Arts, USM.
 Zainal Ariffin Abdul Hamid (Zaibo), Malaysia film & drama actor.
 Daniel Lee Chee Hun, Malaysia singer & winner of Malaysian Idol 2005.

Journalists and activists
 Sharkawi Jirim, TV sports commentator & journalist.
 Datuk Dr. Chamil Wariya, TV news journalist.
Ahmad Fedtri Yahya, TV host Malaysia Hari Ini & Jejak Rasul TV3
Salina Zakaria, TV3 journalist

References